The 2017 Women's Baseball Asian Cup is the inaugural competition of the Women's Baseball Asian Cup. It was held at the Sai Tso Wan Baseball Field in Hong Kong from 2 to 7 September 2017. The tournament followed a single round robin format. The top four teams qualifies for the 2018 Women's Baseball World Cup in the United States.

Japan despite fielding only players under-18 years old, clinched the inaugural title.

Teams

 (Hosts)

Final standing

References

2010s in women's baseball
2017 in baseball
2017 in Hong Kong women's sport
Women's Baseball Asian Cup
September 2017 sports events in China
Sports competitions in Hong Kong
Baseball in Hong Kong